Yun Du-seo (1668–1715) was a painter and scholar of the Joseon period. He is the grandson of Yun Seondo, a great scholar in Korean history. He passed the gwageo exam, but did not enter government service. Rather, he devoted his whole life to painting and studying Confucianism. 
His self-portrait is regarded as one of the many masterpieces of Korean art. Yun Du-seo is also known for his yeongmohwa (animal-and-bird painting).

Gallery

See also
Korean painting
List of Korean painters
Korean art
Korean culture

External links

Brief biography and gallery (in Korean)
Brief biography (in Korean)

1668 births
1715 deaths
17th-century Korean painters
18th-century Korean painters